Hill Climbing is a cycling event, as well as a basic skill of the sport.  As events a hill climb may either be an individual time trial (which forbids cooperation, drafting, or team tactics) or make up part of a regular road race. A hill climb usually represents an event which gains altitude continuously, usually terminating at a summit. Occasionally featured in major professional races, such as the Tour de France, they are usually referred to as mountain time trials, and are not necessarily from the bottom to the top of a hill, as they can simply be a time trial over hilly terrain. 

Hill climbing is one of the key skills required to make cycling more enjoyable. One of the best ways to learn this skill is through practice. There are several ways to practice, solo using intervals or group rides that focus on hill climbs. Being able to tackle hills efficiently can be a "Race Winner" for anyone. Because downhills can be decided in seconds, uphills takes minutes, and being a good climber makes it possible to drop several riders behind.

Great Britain 
In Great Britain there is an end of season tradition of cycling clubs promoting hillclimb time trials in October, for small cash prizes. The hills tend to be relatively short, usually taking between three and five minutes to complete, and the races attract many spectators, including locals not otherwise interested in cycling, who come to watch the pain in the faces of the competitors. Competetors regualy strive to save grams on their equipment, going as far as to drill holes in their bike.

British National Champions

USA 
US hill climbs include the Mt. Evans Hill Climb and the Mount Washington Auto Road Bicycle Hillclimb. There has been an increase in bicycling across the major US cities, especially among men aged between 20 and 64, while rates of cycling by women and children lag. The introduction of bike elevators in the US will help cyclists navigate hillier parts of the city, thus increasing cycling rates.

See also
 List of climbs in cycle racing

External Links 
https://cyclinguphill.com

References

Cycle sport